The Guahiba gracile opossum (Cryptonanus guahybae) is a species of opossum in the family Didelphidae. It is endemic to southern Brazil, where it is known only from three islands, Guahiba, São Lourenço, and Taquara, in the state of Rio Grande do Sul. The poorly studied species is presumed to inhabit subtropical forests, and thus to be threatened by deforestation.

References

Opossums
Endemic fauna of Brazil
Environment of Rio Grande do Sul
Marsupials of South America
Mammals of Brazil
Mammals described in 1931